Monton is a surname. Notable people with the surname include:

Carmen Montón (born 1976), Spanish politician
Katrina Monton (born 1987), Canadian water polo player
Michel Mauléart Monton (1855–1898), Haitian musician and composer
Vince Monton, Australian cinematographer, writer, and director